Rochinia is a genus of crab in the family Epialtidae, containing the following species:

Rochinia ahyongi McLay, 2009
Rochinia annae Richer de Forges & Poore, 2008
Rochinia beauchampi (Alcock & Anderson, 1894)
Rochinia brevirostris (Doflein, 1904)
Rochinia carpenteri (Thomson, 1873)
Rochinia confusa Tavares, 1991
Rochinia cornuta (Rathbun, 1898)
Rochinia crassa (A. Milne-Edwards, 1879)
Rochinia crosnieri Griffin & Tranter, 1986
Rochinia daiyuae Takeda & Komatsu, 2005
Rochinia debilis Rathbun, 1932
Rochinia decipiata Williams & Eldredge, 1994
Rochinia fultoni (Grant, 1905)
Rochinia galathea Griffin & Tranter, 1986
Rochinia globulifera (Wood-Mason & Alcock, 1891)
Rochinia gracilipes A. Milne-Edwards, 1875
Rochinia griffini Davie & Short, 1989
Rochinia hertwigi (Doflein, 1904)
Rochinia hystrix (Stimpson, 1871)
Rochinia kotakae Takeda, 2001
Rochinia makassar Griffin & Tranter, 1986
Rochinia moluccensis Griffin & Tranter, 1986
Rochinia mosaica (Whitelegge, 1900)
Rochinia natalensis Kensley, 1977
Rochinia occidentalis (Faxon, 1893)
Rochinia paulayi Ng & Richer de Forges, 2007
Rochinia planirostris Takeda, 2009
Rochinia pulchra (Miers, 1886)
Rochinia rissoana (Roux, 1828)
Rochinia riversandersoni (Alcock, 1895)
Rochinia sibogae Griffin & Tranter, 1986
Rochinia soela Griffin & Tranter, 1986
Rochinia strangeri Serène & Lohavanijaya, 1973
Rochinia suluensis Griffin & Tranter, 1986
Rochinia tanneri (Smith, 1883)
Rochinia tomentosa Griffin & Tranter, 1986
Rochinia umbonata (Stimpson, 1871)
Rochinia vesicularis (Rathbun, 1907)

References

Majoidea